The Waccamaw darter (Etheostoma perlongum) is a species of freshwater ray-finned fish, a darter from the subfamily Etheostomatinae, part of the family Percidae, which also contains the perches, ruffes and pikeperches. It is found in the eastern United States, where it is endemic to Lake Waccamaw in North Carolina. It inhabits shallow, sandy areas of the Lake.

References

Etheostoma
Fish described in 1946
Taxa named by Carl Leavitt Hubbs
Taxa named by Edward Cowden Raney
Endemic fauna of North Carolina